Quzijaq may refer to:
 Quzijaq-e Olya, village in Iran
 Quzijaq-e Sofla, village in Iran